Wang Huizu (1731–1807) was a Chinese scholar-official, jurist, historian and moralist in Qing dynasty China. He was a commentator on social and local governance issues, and he was also an administrator who preached benevolence in judicial affairs.

Early life 
Wang Huizu was born on 21 January 1731 in Hsiao-Shan, in Zhejiang province, which is situated in the lower-Yangzi valley. This region was marked by the presence of Jiangnan, a city which was the center of Chinese literacy and an intellectually flourishing area. Wang Huizu's father, Wang K'ai, was the warden of a prison in Honan. Wang's mother was K'ai's concubine. Therefore, it could be said that Wang Huizu belonged to the local literati elite. However, Wang K'ai died in Canton in 1741, putting Wang and his mother into a precarious.situation. As a result, the young Wang was forced to struggle in poverty.

Life and career as an official 
In 1747, at the age of sixteen, Wang Huizu passed the local-level examination and therefore gained the status of shengyuan ("born official"). He taught at school in the wake of this success and got married in 1749. Thank to his new status, he became in 1752 the private secretary of Wang Tsung-min, his father-in-law who was a district-magistrate. Wang Huizu specialized into judicial affairs, which was the most lucrative choice for a private secretary. He continued to work as a secretary in judicial matters for thirty-four years, but served sixteen different officials in the provinces of Zhejiang and Jiangsu.

In 1768, Wang Huizu completed the Provincial-level exam which gave him the status of Juren ("recommended man") after having failed height times. After three avorted attempts, he finally passed the highest level of the Civil Service Examination in 1775, reaching the status of Jinshi ("presented scholar").

This new status allowed him to be appointed magistrate of the district of Ning-yüan in Hunan province in 1786. He was re-appointed magistrate in 1788 in the neighboring district of Hsin-t'ien, and re-appointed again in Daozhou in 1790, always in Hunan province. He was dismissed from his post in 1791 because of what he presents in his autobiography as an  intrigue against him. In fact, Wang was asked by his superiors to examine four human skeletons in the county of Guiyang, but he didn't find the requisite medical examiner in the imparted time, which offered a reason to the provincial magistrate to struck off Wang Huizu from the public administration. Afterward, he remained for a moment in Changsha but finally retired in his home district in 1793 where he focused on his work as a scholar.

Wang Huizu became paralyzed in 1795 and died on the first of May 1807.

Scholarship

The jurist 
Wang Huizu wrote two guides of public administration which had become paramount for Chinese officials until the end of the Qing empire. The first one, Tso-shih yao-yen, was printed by Wang's friend, Pso T'ing Po, in 1785. The second, Hsueh-chih i-shuo ("Views on Learning Governance"), was published in 1793. In this second piece, Wang focused on county government and compared  county magistrates to medicine men, wooden puppets or fragile glass screens: all these evocative comparisons reflect the officials' inability to manage an economically and demographically expanding society. Wang Huizu even stated in the preface of his book that he would make a critical study on the routine of Chinese local administrators. He expressed the idea that the scholar is much closer to the people than the administrator and that the official should rely on scholars if he wants to act efficiently, notably regarding the diffusion of Confucian moral values. He also underlined the importance of the hearing of people's plaints as one of the key for a good governance, notably because this activity creates a direct link between the magistrate and the civilians under his jurisdiction. In that respect, Wang Huizu thinks that magistrates should comment on plaints in public session rather than in private session in order to be heard by the community and to prevent the same trouble from coming back.

Wang's work has been very influential for all the Chinese officials after him, there is no denying that his guides have a significant moral dimension. For instance, Wang advocates a compassionate vision of justice. He notably gives the counter-example of a particularly strict magistrate named Zhang, who sentenced a cheater at the civil service examinations to be cangued publicly. the latter asked for his sentence to be adjourned because of the examinations. As the magistrate refused, the cheater's bride committed suicide, and when the young man was released, he committed suicide as well. Therefore, Wang concludes that sentences should be softened by the principle of human compassion (qing).

The historian 
Wang Huizu developed, throughout his life, a strong interest in history. His originality as an historian is that he understood the importance of practical devices, like indexes, as historical tools. His taste for history might have been originated by the Han-shu (history of former Han dynasty) he bought in 1769 in Beijing. Indeed, he certainly hadn't had the opportunity to become familiar with history before this time given his quite modest social origins. In the wake of this first purchase, Wang bought copies of all the twenty-four dynastic histories and compiled all the biographies encountered in these texts into an index in sixty-four volumes. This index called Shih-hsing yün-pien and published in 1783 became vital for the study of Chinese history during the Qing era. He also completed his most prominent piece by two other indexes called Chiu-shih t'ung hsing-ming lüeh and Liao Chin Yuan san-sih t'ung hsing-ming lu both dealing with homonyms found in the histories of the Chinese dynasties. They were respectively printed in 1790 and 1801.Between 1796 and 1800, Wang Huizu worked on Yuan shih pên-chêng, a historical criticism of the history of the early Yuan dynasty.

Autobiography 
In 1795, Wang Huizu began to write his autobiography titled Ping-t'a meng-hen lu ("Traces of Dreams from a Sick Bed"). He first published it in 1796 but continued to enrich it regularly until 1806 and his sons even continued to fill it in after their father's death. This autogiography provides information on the life of the literati class in China but also on public administration, notably Wang's role as a magistrate. He advocates for mediation in the resolution of conflicts rather than lawsuits. If we take the example of formal adjudication, Wang Huizu tells us that when he was in Ning-yüan county in 1787, out of the two-hundred plaints he received each day, only ten usually led to a formal lawsuit. This shows that, in a majority of cases, arbitrage was used to ensure civil justice, this was a convenient mean to maintain social peace.

Although, many literati got involved into literature, notably into poetry, this was not the case of Wang Huizu. However, he was in contact with other Chinese scholars such as the historian Zhang Xuecheng and Zhu Yun, who originated the Complete Library of the Four Treasuries under the Qianlong emperor, Shao Chin-Han, Liu Chu-kao or the bibliophyle Pao T'ing-po.

The moralist 
Wang Huizu was also a moralist, he notably originated a handbook for the management of family-life called Shuang jietang yongxun ("Simple Precepts from the Hall enshrining a Pair of Chaste Widows"). Wang wrote that the two women who inspired his model of the virtuous, chaste wife were his mother and his father's second wife. The book was dedicated to educating his sons as future patriarchs. He underlines that the equilibrium of a family, especially the virtue of its women, depends on the zunzhang yueshu ("family elder's discipline").

References

Qing dynasty essayists
Chinese jurists
Writers from Hangzhou
1731 births
1807 deaths
Qing dynasty historians
Historians from Zhejiang